Zhang Xiuwei (born 13 March 1996) is a Chinese footballer who currently plays for Guangzhou Evergrande in the Chinese Super League.

Club career
Zhang Xiuwei started his football career when he joined Chengdu Youth in 2009. After an unsuccessful trial with Lille, he then joined Lyon's youth academy in April 2014, signing a two-year contract. He made his senior debut for Lyon B on 23 August 2014 in a 1–1 draw against Lyon-Duchère in the Championnat de France Amateur.

On 1 February 2016, Zhang transferred to China League One side Tianjin Quanjian. He made his debut for the club on 8 May 2016 in a 3–2 away loss against Qingdao Jonoon, coming on as a substitute for Xia Ningning in the 67th minute. He became a regular starter after Fabio Cannavaro was appointed as the manager of the club. On 4 September 2016, he scored his first senior goal in a 1–0 home win against Wuhan Zall. He then scored twice on 11 September 2016 in a 3–1 away win against Beijing Renhe. He scored three goals in 15 appearances in the 2016 season as Tianjin won the League One title and promotion to the top tier. He underwent a successful surgery for a metatarsal fracture in November 2016. On 1 April 2017, Zhang made his Super League debut in a 1–0 home win against Henan Jianye, coming on for Wang Yongpo in the 77th minute. He scored his first Super League goal on 3 June 2017 in a 2–1 away win against Shandong Luneng.

On 15 August 2017, Zhang involved in a car accident at Heping District where he hit six cars with his Porsche 991. A blood test showed that his blood alcohol content was 189.3mg/100ml (0.1893%). He was arrested on 16 August 2017 on suspicion of driving under the influence. On 14 September 2017, Zhang, who was out on bail, was temporary banned from football by the Chinese Football Association. He was sentenced to three months' probation on 15 December 2017, missing Tianjin Quanjian's preseason training for the 2018 season. He was also revealed to have used a fake ID under the name Zhang Jixuan (born 13 March 1994) to register for a youth match in 2011. On 30 January 2018, Zhang was banned for nine months from 19 September 2017 to 18 June 2018 for age falsification.

Zhang was linked to fellow Chinese Super League side Guangzhou Evergrande to rejoin Fabio Cannavaro in February 2018. However, he eventually stayed at the club following a disagreement regarding a three-way transaction between Tianjin Quanjian, Guangzhou Evergrande and Shanghai Shenhua. Zhang eventually returned to the first team squad in July 2018. On 17 July 2018, he made his return after 341 days in a 2–1 win against Guangzhou R&F, coming on for Su Yuanjie in the 57th minute.

On 7 February 2019, Zhang transferred to fellow top tier side Guangzhou Evergrande after Quanjian Group was accused of illegal affairs. He made his debut for the club on 1 March 2019 in a 3–0 home win against Tianjin Tianhai. He would go on to establish himself as a regular within the team and go on to win the 2019 Chinese Super League title with the club.

International career
Zhang participated in the 2012 AFC U-16 Championship, 2014 AFC U-19 Championship and 2018 AFC U-23 Championship qualification. However, he failed to represent Chinese under-23 national team for the 2018 AFC U-23 Championship and 2018 Asian Games due to suspension.

In October 2018, Zhang received his first call-up to the Chinese national team by then manager Marcello Lippi. He made his international debut on 16 October 2018 in a 2–0 win against Syria, coming on for Wu Xi in the 87th minute.

Career statistics

Club statistics

International statistics

Honours

Club
Tianjin Quanjian
China League One: 2016

Guangzhou Evergrande
Chinese Super League: 2019

References

External links
 
 

1996 births
Living people
Chinese footballers
Footballers from Sichuan
People from Dazhou
Olympique Lyonnais players
Tianjin Tianhai F.C. players
Guangzhou F.C. players
Chinese Super League players
China League One players
Association football midfielders
Expatriate footballers in France
Chinese expatriate footballers
China international footballers